Anders Svensson (27 March 1939 – 6 December 2007) was a Swedish footballer who played as a midfielder. He played for Malmö FF, PSV and Örgryte IS during his career, and was capped once for Sweden.

References

1939 births
2007 deaths
Association football midfielders
Swedish footballers
Sweden international footballers
Swedish expatriate footballers
Expatriate footballers in the Netherlands
Allsvenskan players
Malmö FF players
PSV Eindhoven players
Örgryte IS players